Goonhavern is a village in north Cornwall, England. It is on the A3075 Newquay to Chiverton Cross road, about two miles east of Perranporth. It is in the civil parish of Perranzabuloe

As well as a village store/post office, a garden centre and several campsites, there is a public house named 'The New Inn' in the centre of the village. Until recently, a model village was a visitor attraction beside the B3285 just south-east of Goonhavern. A traditional village show is held in the community hall in July with prizes awarded for the local produce, flower arrangements, art, craft and photography.

The name Goonhavern comes from the Cornish language words goon, meaning 'downs', and havar, meaning 'summer fallow land'.

History

A railway branch-line to Perranporth and St Agnes ran through Goonhavern from c.1905 but the line was closed by Dr Beeching's cuts in the 1960s and today there is little sign of its precise route through the village centre.

During World War 2, on 12 July 1940, three bombs were dropped on Rosehill Farm. Nobody was injured but a bullock was killed.

References

Villages in Cornwall